Hell's Crossroads is a 1957 American Western film directed by Franklin Adreon and starring Stephen McNally, Peggie Castle, and Robert Vaughn. The film's sets were designed by the art director Frank Arrigo.

Plot
The events leading up to the killing of the outlaw Jesse James in 1882.

Cast
 Stephen McNally as Victor 'Vic' Rodell  
 Peggie Castle as Paula Collins 
 Robert Vaughn as Bob Ford  
 Barton MacLane as Pinkerton Agent Clyde O'Connell  
 Harry Shannon as Clay Ford 
 Henry Brandon as Jesse James  
 Douglas Kennedy as Frank James 
 Grant Withers as Sheriff Steve Oliver  
 Myron Healey as Cole Younger  
 Frank Wilcox as Gov. Crittenden of Missouri 
 Jean Howell as Mrs. Jesse James 
 Morris Ankrum as Wheeler 
 Eddie Baker as Mr. Feniweather 
 George Bell as Deputy 
 Chip Carson as Telegraph Operator  
 Heenan Elliott as Mr. Morley  
 Joe Ferrante as Blacksmith  
 Cactus Mack as Lynch Mob Member 
 John Patrick as Express Agent  
 Jack Perrin as Lynch Mob Member  
 Bob Reeves as Lynch Mob Member

Release
Hell's Crossroads was released in theatres on March 8, 1957. The film can be streamed on Amazon Video.

See also
 List of American films of 1957

References

Sources

External links
 

1957 films
1950s historical films
1957 Western (genre) films
American historical films
American Western (genre) films
Films directed by Franklin Adreon
Republic Pictures films
Films set in the 1880s
1950s English-language films
1950s American films